Protitanotherium (Latin: "before" (pro), + Greek: "giant" (titan) "beast" (therion)) is a genus of brontotheres native to North America and Korea.

References

Brontotheres
Eocene odd-toed ungulates
Priabonian genus extinctions
Eocene mammals of Asia
Fossil taxa described in 1912